Zaccagnaite is a mineral, with a formula Zn4Al2CO3(OH)12·3H2O. It occurs as white hexagonal crystals associated with calcite in cavites in Carrara marble of the Italian Alps and is thought to have formed by hydrothermal alteration of sphalerite in an aluminium rich environment.  It is named after Domenico Zaccagna (1851–1940), an Italian mineral collector.

See also
List of minerals
List of minerals named after people

References
Webmineral data
Mindat.org

Zinc minerals
Aluminium minerals
Carbonate minerals
Hexagonal minerals
Minerals in space group 194